Pieris virginiensis, the West Virginia white, is a butterfly found in North America in the Great Lakes states, along the Appalachians from New England to Alabama, and in southern Ontario. They are typically found in moist deciduous forests. Forestry, development, and a highly-invasive species that it confuses with its host plant (Cardamine) are causing this species to decline.

Along with the butterfly Pieris oleracea, it is threatened by the invasive weed garlic mustard, Alliaria petiolata. The butterflies, having not evolved to be familiar with the plant, confuse it with their host plants. The offspring laid on garlic mustard do not survive.

It has translucent whitish wings of length 4.5–5.5 cm; the hindwing underside has brownish or pale gray scaling along the veins.

Literary references
In line 316 of Pale Fire by Vladimir Nabokov, this butterfly is referenced: “The Toothwort White haunted our woods in May.” The moniker refers to its habit of laying eggs on the toothwort.

References
 US Geological Survey: Northern Prairie Wildlife Research Center: West Virginia White Butterfly
 BugGuide: Species Pieris virginiensis – West Virginia White
 Pieris

Specific

virginiensis
Butterflies of North America
Butterflies described in 1870